The Romania men's national under-18 ice hockey team is the men's national under-18 ice hockey team of Romania. The team is controlled by the Romanian Ice Hockey Federation, a member of the International Ice Hockey Federation. The team represents Romania at the IIHF World U18 Championships.

International competitions

IIHF World U18 Championships

1999: 6th in Division I Europe
2000: 7th in Division I Europe
2001: 2nd in Division III
2002: 8th in Division II
2003: 1st in Division II Group B
2004: 6th in Division I Group A
2005: 6th in Division II Group B
2006: 1st in Division III

2007: 4th in Division II Group B
2008: 4th in Division II Group B
2009: 3rd in Division II Group A
2010: 2nd in Division II Group A
2011: 2nd in Division II Group A
2012: 2nd in Division II Group A
2013: 3rd in Division II Group A
2014: 6th in Division II Group A
2015: 1st in Division II Group B

External links
Romania at IIHF.com

National under-18 ice hockey teams
Ice hockey